"Supersonic" is a song by J.J. Fad from their debut album of the same name.

Background
The first recording of "Supersonic" was released in 1987 by the original line-up of J.J. Fad as the B-side to "Anotha Ho" on Dream Team Records. The new line-up re-recorded and released "Supersonic" in April 1988 as a single; this version reached number 10 on the Billboard Hot Dance/Club Play Songs and number 22 on the Hot R&B/Hip-Hop Singles & Tracks chart. "Supersonic" stayed on the dance charts for eight weeks. The single was certified gold by RIAA, and also got nominated for a Grammy Award for Best Rap Performance in 1989, making them the first all-female rap group to be nominated for a Grammy award.

Charts

Year-end charts

Samples and references in other songs
The song has been sampled and referenced by others in the music industry: 
Fergie in her song "Fergalicious", including parts of the beat and ways in which the song is sung. There has been much debate over whether or not this has been legal sampling, and a lawsuit was filed by former N.W.A. member Arabian Prince against Ruthless Records because he says the Black Eyed Peas did not provide them any royalties on the song. In a later interview with HipHopDX, Arabian Prince stated, “will.i.am did the right thing and the good thing by actually saying, ‘Okay, yeah, I got this from “Supersonic,” we’re gonna go ahead and get the publishing on this and pay royalties to me, whoever else and the girls.’ So that was a good thing.”
In 2004, MF Doom sampled the beatboxing intro from the 1988 video for "Supersonic" in his song "Hoecakes" from his album Mm.. Food.
In 2009, Beastie Boys reference J.J. Fad and "Supersonic" on their Grammy–nominated song "Too Many Rappers".
In 2012, Killer Mike of Run the Jewels referenced J.J. Fad and "Supersonic" in his song "Go!" from his album R.A.P. Music.
In 2013, Eminem referenced J. J. Fad and "Supersonic" in his single "Rap God".

Certifications

References

External links
MC Cookie

1988 singles
J. J. Fad songs
American pop songs
1987 songs
Ruthless Records singles
Atco Records singles